The Heinz Maier-Leibnitz-Preis (Heinz Maier-Leibnitz Prize), in honor and memory of the German physicist Heinz Maier-Leibnitz, is funded by the Bundesministerium für Bildung und Forschung (BMBF, German Ministry of Education and Research), and it is awarded by a selection committee appointed by the Deutsche Forschungsgemeinschaft (DFG, German Research Foundation) and the BMBF. 
Since 2013, there are ten recipients of the prize and each receives 20,000 Euros, which is an increase over the original 16,000 Euros that had been given to six recipients per year until 2012.

Nominees for the award may be put forward by:

Members of the DFG Review Boards
Research universities of the Federal Republic of Germany
The Union der deutschen Akademien der Wissenschaften (Union of the German Academies of Sciences and Humanities)
The Max Planck Society
The Helmholtz Association of German Research Centres
The Fraunhofer Society
The Gottfried Wilhelm Leibniz Scientific Community

See also

 List of physics awards

References

Physics awards
German awards